Nig was the nickname of some American athletes of the late 19th and early 20th century. Before the integration of baseball, a number of baseball players were known by the nickname, often adjudged to be a reference to someone's dark complexion. The nickname is a short form of the ethnic slur nigger. Notable athletes with the nickname include:

 Vincent Borleske (1887–1957), American minor league baseball player, college football player and coach
 Nig Clarke (1882–1949), Canadian-born baseball player in the United States
 George Cuppy (1869–1922), American baseball pitcher
 Nig Fuller (1878–1937), American baseball player
 Johnny Grabowski (1900–1946), American baseball player
 Nig Lipscomb (1911–1978), American baseball player
 Charlie Niebergall (1899–1982), American baseball player
 Nig Perrine (1885–1948), American baseball player
 E. M. Waller (1904–1988), American football player and coach

See also
 Harry Rosen (fl. 1930s–1950s), American mobster in Philadelphia

Lists of people by nickname